Pete the Pup (original, 1924 – June 1930; second Pete, September 9, 1929 – January 28, 1946) was a character in Hal Roach's Our Gang comedies (later known as The Little Rascals) during the 1930s, otherwise known as "Pete, the dog with the ring around his eye", or simply "Petey". The original Pete (sired by "Tudor's Black Jack") was a UKC registered American Pit Bull Terrier named "Pal, the Wonder Dog", and had a natural ring almost completely around his right eye; dye was used to finish it off. The second Pete was an American Pitbull Terrier named Lucenay’s Peter. He was well known for having a circled eye which was added by Hollywood make-up artist Max Factor and credited as an oddity in Ripley's Believe It or Not.

Career

When he was about six months old, Pal the Wonder Dog made an appearance in the Harold Lloyd film The Freshman, in 1925.

Pal first started out as "Tige" in the Buster Brown series in the 1920s. It was during this time that he acquired the circled eye, and when he was recruited to appear in the Our Gang comedies later that year, Hal Roach simply left it on, creating one of the most recognized dogs in film history. 

Trainer and owner Lt. Harry Lucenay used one of Pal's offspring as Pete in the series after Pal was poisoned and died in 1930. The dog, named Lucenay's Peter, was bred by A. A. Keller. The second Pete looked very similar to the first Pete but was a mirror image; the circle around first Pete's right eye was around the left eye of his son, the second Pete. The second Pete appeared as a puppy on Pups Is Pups and was nearly full-grown on his second appearance, School's Out. The second Pete's last Our Gang appearance was The Pooch in 1932. The plot had a dog catcher who attempts to  catch Pete and euthanise him, but is unsuccessful. After Lucenay was fired from the Our Gang series in 1932, he retired Peter to Atlantic City, where he was photographed with children at the Steel Pier. Beginning with Hook and Ladder (filmed the same year), an unrelated dog played Pete, after which, various unrelated dogs would play the role through 1938.

A brief parody of Pete appeared in the 1935 Bob Hope short Watch the Birdie, which was produced by Warner Bros.

In the 1982 cartoon series produced by Hanna-Barbera, he was voiced by Peter Cullen.  In the 1994 feature film remake of The Little Rascals, Pete is an American Bulldog, and in the 2014 movie The Little Rascals Save the Day, Pete is a mutt.

In his last years Tommy "Butch" Bond made public appearances with a similar Pit Bull Terrier he claimed was a descendant of the original Pete the Pup.

Death
Roach used a number of unrelated dogs to portray Pete in Our Gang until 1938. Lucenay's Peter continued on and died of old age on January 28, 1946, in Los Angeles, California, at age 16 years/4 months, two years after the Our Gang series ended. Pete is buried at Los Angeles Pet Memorial Park at Calabasas, Los Angeles County, California, United States.

See also
 List of individual dogs

References

External links

 Training film with Pete and Harry Lucenay (ca 1932)
Pal The Wonder Dog And Pete
Pal the wonder dog – online pedigree

Our Gang
Dog actors
Fictional dogs
1929 animal births
1946 animal deaths
1924 animal births
1930 animal deaths